Camrail is a company operating passenger and freight traffic between the two largest cities in Cameroon and several smaller cities. The company was formed in 1999 and granted a 20-year concession to operate the Cameroon National Railway. The company is a subsidiary of French investment group Bolloré and the railway has been operated by Comazar, a subsidiary of Bolloré, since 1999. According to the Comazar website, the government of Cameroon owns the track while the rolling stock is owned by Camrail.

According to a report by the World Bank in 2011, Camrail ranked relatively high amongst African countries for productivity indicators and was considered a regional leader in terms of implementing a concession to a non-state operator. The 2016 Eséka train derailment took place on Camrail tracks and the company was under investigation by the government and was sued by relatives of the 79 passengers who died in the crash.

Services

Passenger 
As of May 2014, Camrail operated regular daily services on three routes:
 Douala–Kumba
 Douala–Yaoundé
 Yaoundé–Ngaoundéré

Freight 
In 2021, the track including bridges are being upgraded to carry increased bauxite traffic from the Minim, Martap deposits. In the initial stages 5Mt of ore would be carried per annum. A link to the new deepwater port at Kribi is anticipated, requiring a link line from Edéa of about 130 km in length. The mining company concerned is Canyon Resources.

Camrail and Canyon are co-operating closely.

Characteristics

Gauge 
 1,104 km of  gauge track (1995 est.).

Loading Gauge 
 Vertical
 Horizontal

Sleepers 
 mainly concrete sleeper

Axle load 
 Stage 1 upgrade to 25T completed in 2019.

Couplers 
 SA3 for locomotive hauled rolling stock
 Scharfenberg coupler for multiple unit passenger trains

Gradients 
 1.6% (1 in 63) in loaded and empty directions.

Crossing Loops 
 Average spacing about 40 km.

Bridges 
 13 bridges renewed

Communications 
 Fibre optic cable

Colour scheme 
 primarily red
 one shunting/branch line loco green and yellow

Rolling stock 
 Locomotives: 50
 Railroad cars: 1299
 DMU ~~

Accidents 

On 21 October 2016 at approximately 1100 local time, a passenger train derailed close to the town of Eséka. The train, traveling from the capital Yaoundé to the country's main port and economic hub, (Douala), was crammed with people because of road traffic disruption between the two cities and came off the tracks just before reaching Eséka. 79 people were killed and nearly 600 injured.The investigation of the accident revealed that not only speeding but also a dilapidated fleet of equipment and rolling stock of Camrail were the cause of the accident. The express train connection on the route was relaunched in 2021.

Timeline 
 Camrail-Canyon Resources cooperation

See also 
 Camrail locomotive fleet

References

External links 
 Camrail homepage
 Camrail information page at MBendi
 Map of railways in Cameroon

Transport companies of Cameroon
Rail transport in Cameroon
Railway companies of Cameroon
Companies based in Douala